A  is a type of Italian, French or Belgian bakery that specializes in pastries and sweets, as well as a term for such food items. In some countries, it is a legally controlled title that may only be used by bakeries that employ a licensed  in French,  in Dutch,  in German (master pastry chef).

Conspicuous Pâtissiers 

Among the most celebrated French pâtissiers are:
 Pierre Hermé
 Philippe Conticini
 Jean-Paul Hévin
 Christophe Michalak
 Cyril Lignac
 Maison Ladurée
 Maison Lenôtre
 Yann Couvreur

In other countries
In Bangladeshi languages the term in common usage is called  in its shortened form. In Korean and Japanese, the term  is used as well.

Mass-produced pastries are also sometimes called .

In Australia and Lebanon,  is used commonly along with the words bakery or pastry shop.

In Britain, morning goods are pastries, scones, and other products which are baked and sold fresh each day.

In the United States, several bakeries have been described as pâtisseries, including Portland, Oregon businesses Farina Bakery, JinJu Patisserie, Nuvrei, and Pix Pâtisserie.

See also
 Category: Food industry-related lists
 Cakery
 Confectionery store
 Global cuisine
 Konditorei
 List of bakeries
 List of bakery cafés
 List of doughnut shops
 List of pastries
 Yumeiro Patissiere

References

External links

 
French cuisine
Belgian cuisine
Bakeries of France